The 1962 Oregon gubernatorial election took place on November 6, 1962. Republican incumbent Mark Hatfield defeated Democratic nominee Robert Y. Thornton to win re-election.

Candidates

Democratic
 Robert Y. Thornton, Oregon Attorney General

Republican
 Mark Hatfield, incumbent Governor of Oregon

Election results

References

1962
Gubernatorial
Oregon
November 1962 events in the United States